Manos Loïzos (1937–1982) was one of the most important Greek music composers of the 20th century.

Biography
He was born on 22 October 1937 to Greek Cypriot immigrants in Alexandria, Egypt. His parents came from the small village of Agioi Vavatsinias, in the district of Larnaca, Cyprus. Loizos moved to Athens at the age of 17 intending to study pharmacology but soon gave up his studies in order to concentrate on his musical career. He was a self-taught musician, with no formal musical arts training. His first recordings were made in 1963 but he started gaining a larger audience after 1967. By 1975 Loizos had become one of the most popular artists in Greek music.

He died on 17 September 1982 in a hospital in Moscow, Soviet Union after suffering several strokes. He was well known for his leftist political ideology and was an outspoken critic of the Greek military junta. He was also an active member of the Greek Communist Party. The year 2007 was declared "Manos Loizos Year" in Greece.

Discography
He composed many well-known Greek songs and has co-operated with various important composers, singers and lyricists like Mikis Theodorakis, Haris Alexiou, George Dalaras, Vasilis Papakonstantinou,  Christos Leontis, Fondas Ladis, Yannis Negrepontis, Manolis Rasoulis, Giannis Kalatzis, Nâzım Hikmet and many others. His best known co-operation was with his very personal friend, lyricist Lefteris Papadopoulos who wrote the lyrics of many of Loizos' most successful hits.

Some of  Loizos' most famous songs are : 
"Ola se thymizoun (Everything Reminds Me of You)" Lyrics: Manolis Rassoulis
"Jamaica"  Lyrics: Lefteris Papadopoulos
"S' Akoloutho (I follow you)" Lyrics: himself
"To Akordeon (The Accordion)" Lyrics: Yannis Negrepontis
"O Dromos (The Street)"  Lyrics: Kostoula Mitropoulos
"Che" (dedicated to Che Guevara)  Lyrics: himself
"Ah Helidoni mu (Ah, my swallow)" Lyrics: Lefteris Papadopoulos
"De Tha Ksanagapiso (I Shall not Love Again)" Lyrics: Lefteris Papadopoulos
"Paporaki tou Burnova (Paporaki of Burnova)" Lyrics: Lefteris Papadopoulos
"O Koutalianos"  Lyrics: Lefteris Papadopoulos
"Evdokia" (Instrumental Zeibekiko)
"Kalimera Ilie (Goodmorning Sun)"  Lyrics: Manos Loizos. During the 1981-1989 period the song was used as trademark by the political movement PASOK

In 1985, a big concert dedicated to his memory took place in the Athens Olympic Stadium, attended by more than 50,000 people with singers George Dalaras, Haris Alexiou, Giannis Kalatzis, Dimitra Galani and Vasilis Papakonstantinou performing. Manos Loizos' songs and music remain popular until today among all ages of the Greek society.

Studio albums

References

1937 births
1982 deaths
Greek songwriters
Greek people of Cypriot descent
People from Alexandria
Greek communists
Egyptian people of Greek descent
Egyptian emigrants to Greece